Pengyang County (Xiao'erjing:پٍْ‌يَانْ ثِيًا) is a county under the administration of the prefecture-level city of Guyuan in Ningxia Hui Autonomous Region of the People's Republic of China, bordering Gansu province to the due north, east, and south.

Characteristics

Pengyang County is an agricultural county. Its primary agricultural product is wheat, but in recent years the county has also developed forestry. In this it is a model county for Ningxia Hui Autonomous Region. The county government is located in the town of Baiyang, and the county's postal code is 756500. There are Hui people and Han people living together in this county. The population in the whole county is about 250,000. The Hui Chinese Muslim population is 80,000. The average temperature is between 7.4℃ to8.5℃. It is a dry area and also one of the State poverty counties where some people are still in poverty. Because of the bad weather and inconvenient location, it always gets  financial aid from government. Most of the local people are farmers. As a small county, Pengyang is famous for Red plum apricots, ChaoNa chicken, Linseed oil, and dry apricot. there is a different living style from other places because of  Hui Chinese Muslim and Han Chinese life styles.

Administrative divisions
Pengyang County has 3 towns and 7 townships.
3 towns
 Baiyang
 Gucheng
 Wangwa

7 townships
 Jiaocha
 Luowa
 Mengyuan
 Xiaocha
 Fengzhuang
 Chengyang
 Xinji

County-level divisions of Ningxia
Guyuan